Johnny & the Expressions was a group fronted by Johnnie Matthews. They had a hit with "Something I want to Tell You".

Background
Some sources state that the lead singer was Johnny Wyatt who previously was with Rochell & the Candles. Others say it's Johnny Matthews. They recorded for the Josie label.

Career
In 1965, the group released "Something I Want to Tell You" on the Josie Records label. It was composed by Ralph Meeks. The B side "Where Is The Party" was composed by Johnny Matthews.
In its October 30 issue, Billboard reported that "Something I Want to Tell You" was a top DJ pick in San Francisco and Baltimore. For the week ending February 5, 1966, the single was in the Top Sellers in Top Markets chart, 22 In New York, 19 in Philadelphia and 19 in Pittsburgh. The single peaked in the Hot 100 at #79 on December 2, 1966. It also peaked at #14 in the R&B charts.

Later years
The group was founded by Johnny Matthews, who died on August 25, 2022 after a battle with illness. He was 83 years old.

Discography (USA)

References

Josie Records artists